The 2019 1. divisjon is the second tier of Norwegian women's football in 2019. The season kicked off on 13 April 2019 and is scheduled to finish on 3 November 2019.

Due to a reduction of teams from 12 to 10 teams in both the first and the second tier, the top placed team will have to play promotion play-offs against the tenth-placed team in Toppserien to win promotion. Four teams are relegated directly to the 2. divisjon. The eighth-placed teams play relegation play-offs against a team from 2. divisjon.

League table

Position by round

Results

Promotion play-offs
The promotion play-offs will this season be contested by the 10th placed team in Toppserien, Lyn, and the winner of the 1. divisjon, IF Fløya.

Lyn won 7–1 on aggregate.

Relegation play-offs
The relegation play-offs will this season be contested by the 8th placed team in 1. divisjon, Grand Bodø, and the winner of the 2. divisjon, KIL/Hemne.

KIL/Hemne won 5–4 on aggregate.

References

External links
Fotball.no

2018
2
Norway
Norway